Sevastopolskaya is a station on the Serpukhovsko-Timiryazevskaya line of the Moscow Metro. It was designed by N. I. Demchinsky, Yu. A. Kolesnikova, and Nina Alyoshina, and opened in 1983.

From this station, riders will be transfer to Kakhovskaya on the Bolshaya Koltsevaya line. Historically, this was the first interchange in the Moscow Metro outside of the Koltsevaya line.

References

Moscow Metro stations
Serpukhovsko-Timiryazevskaya Line
Railway stations located underground in Russia